Jamil Roberts (born March 4, 1986) is an American former soccer player who played as a defender. He played one match for the San Jose Earthquakes in 2008.

Club career

Youth and college
Roberts attended Washington High School in Fremont, California (where his coach was Johnny Kinnear, brother of Dominic Kinnear) and played college soccer at Santa Clara University, where he played in 80 games and scored five goals. He was named WCC Defensive Player of the Year in 2007, and was named to the All-WCC First Team, the NSCAA All-Far West Region First Team and the College Soccer News All-American Third Team. He also played club soccer for local team Fremont Lazio.

San Jose Earthquakes
On January 18, 2008, Roberts was drafted with the 45th overall pick by FC Dallas in the 2008 MLS SuperDraft. However, on April 3, 2008, Roberts signed with the San Jose Earthquakes after the club acquired his rights from FC Dallas in exchange for a third round pick in the 2009 Supplemental Draft. Throughout the 2008 season, Roberts mainly played with the reserves in the MLS Reserve League. On June 14, 2008, Roberts made his professional debut for the Earthquakes against the Los Angeles Galaxy, coming on as a second-half substitute.

International career
As a youth, Roberts played 90 minutes for the United States U17 team in wins over Brazil, Serbia and Montenegro and Northern Ireland in the elite group of the 2005 Milk Cup.

Personal
He is the younger brother of fellow professional soccer player Troy Roberts.

References

External links
 MLS player profile
 Santa Clara bio

1986 births
Living people
American soccer players
People from Fremont, California
San Jose Earthquakes players
Santa Clara Broncos men's soccer players
Major League Soccer players
FC Dallas draft picks
United States men's youth international soccer players
Soccer players from California
Sportspeople from Alameda County, California
Association football defenders